Richard James Allen (born 1960) is a contemporary Australian poet, dancer, actor and filmmaker. The former artistic director of the Poets Union Inc, and founding director of the Australian Poetry Festival, Allen was co-artistic director with Karen Pearlman of That Was Fast (New York City) and Tasdance (Launceston), and now at The Physical TV Company (Sydney).

Allen has published twelve books of poetry, fiction or performance texts, most recently More Lies (2021), The short story of you and I (2019), Fixing the Broken Nightingale (2014), The Kamikaze Mind (2006), and Performing the Unnameable: An Anthology of Australian Performance Texts (1999), co-edited with Karen Pearlman. He received the 2005 University of Technology, Sydney, Chancellor's Award for Best Doctoral Thesis. A multi-award-winning film adaptation of his Kenneth Slessor Prize for Poetry-nominated book, Thursday's Fictions (1999), was first broadcast by the Australian Broadcasting Corporation in 2007. This surreal dance fantasy also has a Second Life presence, Thursday's Fictions in Second Life.

He is the grandson of World War II Major General Arthur Samuel "Tubby" Allen and the brother of art critic Christopher Allen.

Books

References

Further reading
U:  No 04: 26 May – 6 June 2006 –  Review by Jaine P Stockler of The Kamikaze Mind
   Jacket (magazine) 33 — July 2007 – "The Exhilaration and Anxiety of Free Fall"  – Dr Mark Seton reviews The Kamikaze Mind by Richard James Allen
Second Life Insider, 18 October 2007  Thursday's Fictions, by Tateru Nino

External links

Creative Websites:
The Physical TV Company
The Physical TV Channel on YouTube
#RichardReads - an online compendium of Global Poetry, Read Aloud
Performing The Unnameable: An Anthology of Australian Performance Texts
Out Of The Labyrinth Of The Mind: Manifesting A Spiritual Art Beyond Dualism (Abstract for Doctorate of Creative Arts)

Interviews:
TASA Media Voices Series, interview on creativity across various artforms (7 October, 2021) 
Tony Messenger, Verity La, interview on poetry, spirituality and the arts (24 February, 2020)
Paul Brookes, The Wombwell Rainbow, interview on writing history and practice (7 August, 2019)
Magdalena Ball, Compulsive Reader, interview on poetry and creativity (24 June, 2019)
Samuel Elliott, Backstory Journal, interview on poetic form (16 June, 2019)
Eddy Diamond, FBi Radio, interview on poetry (2 February, 2019)
 Interactive Media Innovation (imi) industry leader interview (April, 2012)
Andrew Mikkelsen interview on yoga, creativity, philosophy and personal history (21 February, 2012)
Josef Brown interview on dance film and creativity (30 May, 2011)
Orion Mitchell interview on dance film and the internet, as part of Dancing Through YouTube (April 26, 2011)
SPIKE Magazine interview on dance for film and virtual worlds (6 April 2011)
Transmedia Victoria – Meet transmedia artist: Richard James Allen (20 December, 2010)
RealTime interview on mixed reality dance film (Issue #99, October–November 2010)
ABC Radio National interview on writing for Second Life (The Book Show, 10 October 2007)
RealTime interview on dance film (Issue #80, August–September 2007)
RealTime interview on dance and poetry (Issue #10, December–January 1995)

Archives:
Richard James Allen at Red Room Poetry
Richard James Allen at the Australian Poetry Library
Richard James Allen at Australia Dancing, National Library of Australia

Richard James Allen at the National Film and Sound Archive
Richard James Allen at the Manuscripts Collection, the State Library of New South Wales
Richard James Allen at AustLit
The Physical TV Company Website selected for preservation by Pandora, Australia's Web Archive, at the National Library of Australia

1960 births
Australian male dancers
Australian choreographers
Australian film directors
Australian screenwriters
Australian film producers
Place of birth missing (living people)
20th-century Australian male actors
20th-century Australian poets
21st-century Australian male actors
21st-century Australian poets
Australian documentary filmmakers
Living people